The 2022 Porto Challenger was a professional tennis tournament played on hard courts. It was the second edition of the tournament which was part of the 2022 ATP Challenger Tour. It took place in Porto, Portugal between 4 and 10 July 2022.

Singles main-draw entrants

Seeds

 1 Rankings are as of 27 June 2022.

Other entrants
The following players received wildcards into the singles main draw:
  Pedro Araújo
  João Domingues
  Pedro Sousa

The following players received entry into the singles main draw as alternates:
  Antoine Bellier
  Jason Jung

The following players received entry from the qualifying draw:
  Thomaz Bellucci
  Ulises Blanch
  Gabriel Décamps
  Omar Jasika
  Aidan McHugh
  Daniel Rodrigues

The following player received entry as a lucky loser:
  Kenny de Schepper

Champions

Singles

  Altuğ Çelikbilek def.  Christopher O'Connell 7–6(7–5), 3–1 ret.

Doubles

  Yuki Bhambri /  Saketh Myneni def.  Nuno Borges /  Francisco Cabral 6–4, 3–6, [10–6].

References

2022 ATP Challenger Tour
July 2022 sports events in Portugal